The Great Detective: The Amazing Rise and Immortal Life of Sherlock Holmes is a non-fiction book by Zach Dundas about Sherlock Holmes. 

The book begins with the author's personal visit to the Sherlock Holmes Museum and then progresses chronologically through an exploration of Sherlock Holmes fandom, Sherlockian Societies such as The Baker Street Irregulars, and the Sherlockian game

Reception
Julia Knaus, writing for Transformative Works and Cultures, called the work "a fascinating read". Clea Simon of The Boston Globe appreciated the scholarship but found Dundas' use of personal memoir as framing device to be "the least interesting thread". Kirkus Reviews called it "A bright read for Sherlock's fans". Leslie S. Klinger, writing for the Los Angeles Review of Books, found Dundas' account of Holmesian history "skillful" and said the book "feels like a long conversation with a new friend".

See also
From Holmes to Sherlock

References

External links
Zach Dundas

Sherlock Holmes
2015 non-fiction books
Houghton Mifflin books